The Inter-Agency Task Force for the Management of Emerging Infectious Diseases (IATF-EID) is a task force organized by the executive of the government of the Philippines to respond to affairs concerning emerging infectious diseases in the country.

History 
The IATF-EID was created through Executive Order No. 168 issued by President Benigno Aquino III in 2014. It was organized as the government's instrument to assess, monitor, contain, control and prevent the spread of any potential epidemic in the Philippines.

COVID-19 pandemic 

The IATF-EID convened in January 2020 to address the growing viral outbreak in Wuhan, China. They made a resolution to manage the spreading of the new virus, which was known at the time as 2019 novel coronavirus (2019-nCoV) and eventually renamed to severe acute respiratory syndrome coronavirus 2 (SARS-CoV-2), the virus that causes COVID-19. On March 9, 2020, President Duterte called the IATF-EID amidst the rising cases of COVID-19 in the Philippines.

On March 25, 2020, the IATF-EID revealed a National Action Plan (NAP) to slow down the spread of COVID-19. The NAP was created to effectively and efficiently implement and decentralize the system of managing the COVID-19 pandemic. In addition, the IATF-EID created the National Task Force Against COVID-19 headed by Department of National Defense Secretary Delfin Lorenzana, which handles the operational command. At the same time, the IATF-EID became the "policy-making body of operations" while the National Incident Command administers the daily concerns and operations.

The Joint Task Force COVID-19 Shield headed by Police Lt. Gen. Vicente D. Danao Jr. is a task force intended to enforce quarantine protocols in border checkpoints and streets, and maintain peace, order, and security throughout the country to help control the spread of COVID-19. The task force is composed of the Philippine National Police (PNP), the Armed Forces of the Philippines (AFP), the Philippine Coast Guard (PCG), the Bureau of Fire Protection (BFP), and Barangay tanods.

The IATF-EID  appointed Metropolitan Manila Development Authority (MMDA) OIC Baltazar Melgar and Bangsamoro Chief Minister Murad Ebrahim to lead the regional inter-agency task groups in Metro Manila and Bangsamoro, respectively. The Office of Civil Defense was tasked to lead the regional task forces in other regions. Local Chief Executives of Municipalities, Cities, Provinces, and Barangays are also tasked as Chairpersons of the Local Task Forces.

Composition 
The IATF-EID is composed of the following executive departments and agencies:
 Chair: Department of Health
 Co-Chair: 
 Department of National Defense
 Members
 Department of Agriculture
 Department of Budget and Management
 Department of Education
 Department of Finance
 Department of Foreign Affairs
 Department of Information and Communications Technology
 Department of the Interior and Local Government
 Department of Justice
 Department of Labor and Employment
 Department of Migrant Workers
 Department of Public Works and Highways
 Department of Science and Technology
 Department of Social Welfare and Development
 Department of the Interior and Local Government
 Department of Tourism
 Department of Trade and Industry
 Department of Transportation
 Office of the Executive Secretary
 Office of the Press Secretary
 Presidential Management Staff
 Office of the Special Assistant to the President
 Commission on Higher Education
 Technical Education and Skills Development Authority
 National Economic and Development Authority
 Office of the Chief Presidential Legal Counsel
 Civil Service Commission

The Joint Task Force COVID-19 Shield is composed of the following who will ensure that IATF Guidelines/Protocols are strictly enforced.
 Lead Agency: Philippine National Police
 Members:
 Armed Forces of the Philippines
 Bureau of Fire Protection
 Philippine Coast Guard
 All local government units

Notes

References

2014 establishments in the Philippines
COVID-19 pandemic in the Philippines
Healthcare in the Philippines
Task forces
Organizations associated with the COVID-19 pandemic
Government agencies established in 2014
Establishments by Philippine executive order